Yasunami Ryosuke (born April 19, 1957) is a Japanese jurist who has served as an associate Justice of the Supreme Court of Japan since 2021.

Education and Career 
Ryosuke was born on April 19, 1957, in Japan. He attended the University of Tokyo and graduated with a degree in law in 1981. Ryosuke served as a judge in various lower courts for nearly 40 years before his appointment to the Supreme Court. Ryosuke served in the following positions:

 1983-93: Judge, Hiroshima District Court
 1993-95: Judge, Kobe District Court
 1995-98: Judge, Tokyo District Court
 1998-99: Director, Second Division of the Administrative Affairs Bureau, Supreme Court
 1999-2001: Director, First and Third Divisions of the Administrative Affairs Bureau, Supreme Court
 2001-05: Director, Re-numeration Division of the Personnel Affairs Bureau, Supreme Court
 2005-07: Presiding Judge, Tokyo District Court
 2007-10: Director of Secretariat, Tokyo High Court
 2010-11: Presiding Judge, Tokyo District Court
 2011-14: Director General, Personnel Affairs Bureau, Supreme Court
 2014-16: President, Shizuoka District Court
 2016-18: Presiding Judge, Tokyo High Court
 2018: President, Tokyo District Court
 2018-21: President, Osaka High Court

Supreme Court 
On July 16, 2021, Ryosuke was appointed to the Supreme Court of Japan. In Japan, justices are formally nominated by the Emperor (at that time, Naruhito) but in reality the Cabinet chooses the nominees and the Emperor's role is a formality.

Ryosuke's term is scheduled to end on April 18, 2027 (one day before he turns 70). This is because all members of the court have a mandatory retirement age of 70.

References 

Japanese jurists
1957 births
Living people
University of Tokyo alumni